Breast torture (also called breast play, nipple torture or tit torture) is a BDSM activity in which sexual stimulation is provided through the intentional application of physical pain or constriction to the breasts, areolae or nipples of a submissive. It is a popular activity among the kink community. The recipient of such activities may wish to receive them as a result of masochism or they may have a desire to please a dominant who is sadistic. Those involved may also be motivated by breast fetishism. Mild breast torture such as light impact play on the breasts is also occasionally used outside of the BDSM context to provide stimulation and pleasure during conventional sex.

The breasts are sometimes used to satisfy a desire for erotic humiliation. Cruel or disparaging references to the breasts can be used to produce verbal humiliation, while physical humiliation can be achieved through discipline techniques such as breast punishment.

Kink and BDSM activities are never completely free from risk, but some forms of breast torture, such as the use of clothespins on nipples, light flagellation and simple breast bondage, are considered to be relatively safe and benign. In contrast, some forms of breast torture, such as severe caning, amateur piercing, or being suspended by the breasts, are considered to be activities that include great risk. Suspension bondage techniques do not allow someone to be safely suspended by their breasts. Adequate precautions are needed to prevent injury or blood loss.

Techniques
There are a variety of techniques used for breast torture, and they are sometimes combined to produce a greater erotic effect.

Nipple torture

Nipple torture, also called BDSM nipple play, is the application of erotic pain to the nipples. It is a popular element of breast torture. It can include biting, sucking, and roughly touching or rubbing the nipples and the areolae. Submissives who experience it often enjoy it, even though it is painful. Some people find their nipples to be more erotically sensitive than their genitals. They are an erogenous zone of the body and their stimulation using techniques such as pinching can in some cases lead to orgasm.

During the 1970s, a study of S&M-themed contact magazines and club members in Germany identified nipple torture as one of the six most popular activities. BDSM literature sometimes shows household items attached to erect nipples to provide a pinching sensation. These include clothespins, mousetraps, clothes hangers with integral clips, or pairs of chopsticks with elastic bands wrapped around each end. If the nipples are prominent enough they can have elastic bands secured directly round them.

The commercially produced alternative for nipple torture is the nipple clamp, a device which is sold as a type of sex toy. With many types of nipple clamps the degree of tightness is variable and the amount of pain produced is dependent upon how tightly they are applied. The pinching restricts the blood flow and, when the attachments are removed, further pain may be caused by the return of normal blood flow. Weights are sometimes hung from nipple clamps to tighten the pinching or to add a tugging sensation that varies as the wearer moves. Nipple clamps are sometimes sold with a chain connecting them so that a dominant can pull on it to create tension. Alternatively nipple clamps may be attached to ropes, chains, or wall fixtures.

Twisting the nipples produces a painful sensation and nipple pain can be intensified by twisting nipple clamps, an action which pushes the nipple into the breast. A titty twister is a BDSM device used to inflict pain on the breasts and especially the nipples in this way. They are made in a variety of styles, but all have nipple clamps that can be made to rotate once in position, twisting the breasts and nipples of the person wearing the device.

There are some health risks associated with nipple torture. Nipple clamps that are positioned wrongly can cause small cuts. Nipple bondage can result in damage to the nipples and tearing the skin of the nipples can cause scarring. Regular heavy nipple play that produces scabbing and bruising can cause internal scar tissue and de-sensitization, resulting in permanent nerve and tissue damage. During pregnancy the nipples may be too sensitive for nipple clamps, and nipple stimulation can cause the release of the contraction-inducing hormone oxytocin.

Suction

Commercially produced nipple pumps, also known as nipple suction cups, are small cylindrical devices used to produce full nipple erections by pulling on the nipples. They also increase the circulation to the nipples and provide erotic nipple stimulation. They can be used to sensitise the nipples for subsequent nipple torture, and some models allow the suction level to be increased enough for the device itself to be used for nipple torture. Breast pumps can be used for erotic lactation as part of BDSM play. They can trigger lactation without pregnancy, allowing for the milking of a submissive's breasts. Suction is sometimes applied to the breasts via erotic cupping, a technique in which cups, bowls or bells are used to create suction on the skin in a method similar to the cupping therapy used in alternative medicine. The sensation can be erotic, and drawing blood to the skin can make the area more sensitive once the cups are removed. Larger cups create more suction, which makes the resulting sensations more intense. The practice can also cause pain and leave bruised marks on the skin.

Piercing

Nipple piercings are sometimes used to facilitate breast torture. Once inserted, piercing rings can simply be pulled as part of BDSM play. Alternatively they can be attached to heavy chains or to nipple cords (pieces of thin rope or heavy string) and the other end of these chains or cords can be attached to screw eyes or pulleys to allow the nipples to be put under great tension. Unpierced nipples can have nipple rings or nipple cuffs placed around them and tightened to create and sustain nipple erections and also to cause pain.

Breast bondage

Breast bondage techniques are used to compress, bind, lift or squash the breasts, which in turn makes them more sensitive and erotically stimulates them, while focussing the submissive's attention on their submissive state and their vulnerability. The high concentration of nerve endings in the breasts means that having them tied tightly can be a painful experience. Increasing and trapping the blood flow in them heightens their sensitivity. Breast bondage can be used as a show of power on the part of the dominant person or a way to inflict torture and punishment. Breast torture may include binding the breasts with ropes, chains, wire or bondage tape, or heavy rubber bands may be placed around the base of the breasts. Tight breast bondage is often depicted in BDSM imagery, usually using rope bondage techniques which are often derived from Japanese bondage, although breast bondage differs from most bondage techniques in that it is not intended to restrict mobility. Breast bondage techniques typically lift and separate the breasts. A rope is commonly tied around the base of each breast causing them to bulge forwards, or ropes above and below the breasts push them together so that they are pushed outwards from the chest. This effect is accentuated if the hands are tied behind the back. Sometimes rope is instead used to flatten the breasts against the chest. Breast bondage usually leaves the nipples and much of the breast exposed for other breast torture techniques such as whipping and clamping.

Breasts are sometimes compressed using a breast press. This device consists of two parallel bars separated and fastened at either end by steel bolts or adjustable screws. The bars are slightly longer than the body is wide and are typically made of wood. Many of these devices are homemade. The breasts are placed between the bars and the bolts or screws are tightened to painfully compress them. The device is most effective on larger breasts. Sometimes the inside of the bars is lined with sandpaper or other uncomfortable surfaces for additional pain.

Breast bondage ropes, particularly if tied tightly, can damage the breasts. Using conventional rope for breast bondage can result in rope burns. Ropes designed for BDSM use are typically made from soft cotton that lies flat against the skin to avoid this. Breast bondage also risks cutting off the blood circulation to the breasts and they should not be bound too tightly nor for too long. Tightly bound breasts can become swollen and darker, which some people like. However, photographs of breast bondage sometimes show breasts that have turned purple or blue which indicates that blood circulation has been cut off. Numbness or a lack of sensation in the breasts are also indicators of this. It can be damaging and scissors can be used to remove ropes quickly if needed. It is also possible for breast bondage to restrict the flow of blood to the arms or legs, leading to nerve damage, muscle destruction, and eventually blood clots. Breast bondage in Japanese culture is generally practiced by women under thirty as a result of the body's decreasing ability to heal with age.

Impact play

Tit whipping is a type of breast torture that involves the flagellation of a submissive's breasts, usually with a small cat o' nine tails whip called a flogger. Other types of impact play that are applied to the breasts include slapping, punching, kicking, spanking and caning. The implements used range from BDSM toys to household items such as spatulas and wooden spoons. Objects are sometimes shot at the breasts as a form of ballistic punishment.

The most common negative consequence of this type of breast torture is bruising but aggressive caning can result in welts, and heavy impact play applied to the breasts can rupture the mammary glands and lymph glands and cause breast cysts.

Other techniques

Sensations such as squeezing, pinching, caressing, poking and tickling can be induced by hand or mouth or by making use of a variety of implements. Rubbing the breasts with rough or abrasive materials can be used to produce painful sensations as part of abrasion play, and other sensations can be produced by applying stimulating plant materials such as chilli, ginger or stinging nettles.

Clothespins can be attached to the breasts in large numbers to pinch the skin in multiple places. When they are removed and the blood flows back a sensation of warm pain is experienced. The clothespins can be attached together using a string or wire and pulled off, creating a BDSM device known as a zipper. Alternatively the skin of the breasts can have nipple clamps, a wartenberg wheel or play piercing needles applied to it.

Temperature play is sometimes applied to the breasts. For example, certain types of hot wax can be dripped onto the breasts as part of wax play, in some instances producing a wax mould of the nipple and breast. Care needs to be taken as wax play can produce irritation, burning or blistering of the skin.

Erotic electrostimulation of the breasts is considered unsafe due to the risk of electrocution.

See also
 Bondage pornography
 Cock and ball torture
 Female submission
 List of BDSM equipment
 Pussy torture

References

External links

 

BDSM activities
Breast